Mahammad Mammadov  (born june 27, 1997 in Azerbaijan) is an Azerbaijani Taekwondo athlete who won a bronze medal at the 2017 World Taekwondo Championships
after being defeated in 1/02-finale against Mirhashem Hosseini.

References 

Living people
1997 births
Azerbaijani male taekwondo practitioners
Universiade medalists in taekwondo
Universiade bronze medalists for Azerbaijan
European Games competitors for Azerbaijan
Taekwondo practitioners at the 2015 European Games
World Taekwondo Championships medalists
Medalists at the 2017 Summer Universiade
21st-century Azerbaijani people